Kyotera is a town in the southern part of the Central Region of Uganda. It is a municipality in Kyotera District. However, the district headquarters are located at Kasaali.

Location
Kyotera is located in the newly-created Kyotera District. The coordinates of the town are 0°37'54.0"S, 31°32'36.0"E (Latitude:-0.631667; Longitude:31.543333).

Population
During the 2002 Uganda National Census, Kyotera's population was enumerated at 7,590. In 2010, the Uganda Bureau of Statistics (UBOS) estimated the population at 8,800. In 2011, UBOS estimated the mid-year population of at 9,000. During the national census and household survey of August 2014, the population of Kyotera was enumerated at 12,789 people.

Points of interest
The following additional points of interest are located inside or near Kyotera: (a) the offices of Kyotera Town Council (b) Kyotera central market (c) the Offices of National Water & Sewerage Corporation, Kyotera Cluster (d) Masaka–Mutukula Road, passing through the town in a north/south configuration. and (e) Kasaali, a northern suburb of Kyotera is the location of the Kyotera District headquarters.

Photos
 Kyotera Market In 2007

See also
 Rakai District
 Kalisizo
 List of cities and towns in Uganda

References

External links
Website of Kyotera District Local Government

Kyotera District
Populated places in Central Region, Uganda